Into Motion is the second album released by Salvador.  The album reached 198 on the Billboard top 200.

Track listing
 "Breathing Life" (Cindy Morgan, Chris Rodriguez) - 3:37
 "City On A Hill" (Cindy Morgan, Chris Rodriguez) - 4:32
 "When I Pray" (Pete Kipley, Brad O'Donnell) - 4:15
 "Can't Keep It In" (Nic Gonzales, Pete Kipley, David Mullen, Matthew West) - 3:12
 "Black Flower" (Nic Gonzales, David Mullen) - 5:03
 "God People" (Nic Gonzales, David Mullen, Andy Selby) - 2:51
 "Alegria" (Steve Coronado) - 2:24
 "Psalm 3" (Art Gonzales, Josh Gonzales, Nic Gonzales) -5:22
 "Salt and Light" (Nic Gonzales, Chris Rodriguez) - 4:48
 "Worthy" (Pablo Gabaldon, Nic Gonzales, David Mullen) - 3:35
 "Mighty King Of Love" (Nic Gonzales, Pete Kipley, Billy Sprague) - 2:43

Personnel 
Salvador
 Nic Gonzales – guitars, lead vocals, backing vocals 
 Chris Bevins – keyboards 
 Josh Gonzales – bass, backing vocals 
 Art Gonzales – drums 
 Eliot Torres – percussion, backing vocals
 Billy Griego – trombone, backing vocals 
 Pablo Gabaldon – trumpet 

Additional musicians
 Carl Hergesell – keyboards 
 Craig Young – programming, bass 
 Chris Rodriguez – guitars, backing vocals 
 Pete Kipley – guitars, loops
 Bruce Hughes – bass 
 Dan Needham – drums 
 Carlos Sosa – saxophones, horn arrangements 
 Raul Vallejo – trombone, horn arrangements 
 Paul Armstrong – trumpet 
 David Davidson – string arrangements
 Gene Miller – backing vocals

Production 
 Judith Hibbard – executive producer, A&R direction 
 Chris Rodriguez – producer (1, 2, 8, 9)
 Pete Kipley – producer (3-6, 10, 11), hard disk editing (3-6, 10, 11)
 Nic Gonzales – producer (7)
 Craig Young – recording (1, 2, 8, 9), overdub recording 
 F. Reid Shippen – mixing (1, 2, 7, 8, 9)
 Csaba Petocz – recording (3-6, 10, 11), mixing (3-6, 10, 11)
 Steve Chadie – recording (7), mix assistant (7)
 Carlos Sosa – overdub recording 
 Dan Shike – mix assistant (3-6, 10, 11)
 Tom Coyne – mastering 
 Cheryl T. McTyre – A&R coordinator 
 Jamie Kiner – production coordinator (1, 2, 7, 8, 9)
 Bridgett Evans O'Lannerghty – production coordinator (3-6, 10, 11)
 Louis LaPrad – art direction 
 Katherine Petillo – art direction 
 Roy Roper – design, illustration 
 Kenny Braun – photography 
 Michael Smith & Associates – management

Studios
 Recorded at Arlyn Studios (Austin, Texas); The Indigo Room (Franklin, Tennessee).
 Mixed at Recording Arts (Nashville, Tennessee); Opium Sound (Hollywood, California).
 Mastered at Sterling Sound (New York City, New York).

References

2002 albums
Salvador (band) albums